Ewald is a given name and surname used primarily in Germany and Scandinavia. It derives from the Germanic roots ewa meaning "law" and wald meaning "power, brightness". People and concepts with the name include:

Surnames
Douglas Ewald (1937-2021), American politician and consultant
Carl Anton Ewald (1845–1915), pioneering German gastroenterologist
Johann Ewald (1744–1813), Danish general and veteran of the American Revolutionary War
Johannes Ewald (1743–1781), Danish dramatist and poet
Heinrich Ewald (1803–1875), German orientalist and theologian
Paul Peter Ewald (1888–1985), German physicist, pioneer of X-ray diffraction and crystallography
Paul W. Ewald (born 1953), evolutionary biologist specializing in the evolution of infectious disease
Reinhold Ewald (born 1956), German astronaut
Victor Ewald (1860–1935), Russian composer

Given names
Either of the Two Ewalds, saints in Old Saxony about 692
Ewald Max Hoyer (1863–1957), founding mayor of Bossier City, Louisiana
Ewald Krolis (1947-2006), Surinamese kaseko singer
Ewald Stadler (born 1961), Austrian politician
Ewald von Kleist (1881-1954), German field marshal during World War II
Ewald von Lochow (1885-1942), Prussian officer and later General of Infantry during World War I, recipient of Pour le Mérite with Oakleaves
Ewald von Demandowsky (1906-1946), German film producer who held the office of a Nazi German Reichsfilmdramaturg and was head of production at the Tobis Film company in the Third Reich

Concepts
Ewald's sphere (named after Paul Peter Ewald), a geometric construct used in crystallography  
Ewald summation (named after Paul Peter Ewald), a method for computing the interaction energies of periodic systems

See also

German masculine given names